

1953/54

Source: 1954 Roster, Maccabi Tel Aviv website

1954/55

Source: 1955 Roster, Maccabi Tel Aviv website

1955/56

Source: 1956 Roster, Maccabi Tel Aviv website

1956/57

Source: 1957 Roster, Maccabi Tel Aviv website

1957/58

Source: 1958 Roster, Maccabi Tel Aviv website

1958/59

Source: 1959 Roster, Maccabi Tel Aviv website

1959/60

Source: 1960 Roster, Maccabi Tel Aviv website

1960/61

Source: 1961 Roster, Maccabi Tel Aviv website

1961/62

Source: 1962 Roster, Maccabi Tel Aviv website

1962/63

Source: 1963 Roster, Maccabi Tel Aviv website

1963/64

Source: 1964 Roster, Maccabi Tel Aviv website

1964/65

Source: 1965 Roster, Maccabi Tel Aviv website

1965/66

Source: 1966 Roster, Maccabi Tel Aviv website

1966/67

Source: 1967 Roster, Maccabi Tel Aviv website

1967/68

Source: 1968 Roster, Maccabi Tel Aviv website

1968/69

Source: 1969 Roster, Maccabi Tel Aviv website

1969/70

Source: 1970 Roster, Maccabi Tel Aviv website

1970/71

Source: 1971 Roster, Maccabi Tel Aviv website

1971/72

Source: 1972 Roster, Maccabi Tel Aviv website

1972/73

Source: 1973 Roster, Maccabi Tel Aviv website

1973/74

Source: 1974 Roster, Maccabi Tel Aviv website

1974/75

Source: 1975 Roster, Maccabi Tel Aviv website

1975/76

Source: 1976 Roster, Maccabi Tel Aviv website

1976/77 
Titles
 European Champions Cup Champion
 Israeli League Champion
 Israeli State Cup Champion

Roster

Source: 1977 Roster, Maccabi Tel Aviv website

1977/78 
Titles
  Israeli League Champion
  Israeli State Cup Champion

Honors
  European Champions Cup Semi Finalist (3rd)

Roster

Source: 1978 Roster, Maccabi Tel Aviv website

1978/79 
Titles
  Israeli League Champion
  Israeli State Cup Champion

Honors
  European Champions Cup Semi Finalist (3rd)

Roster

Source: 1979 Roster, Maccabi Tel Aviv website

1979/80 
Titles
 Israeli League Champion
 Israeli State Cup Champion

Honors
 European Champions Cup Runner-Up

Roster

Source: 1980 Roster, Maccabi Tel Aviv website

1980/81
Titles
 European Champions Cup Champion
 FIBA Intercontinental Cup Champion
 Israeli League Champion
 Israeli State Cup Champion

Roster

Source: 1981 Roster, Maccabi Tel Aviv website

1981/82 
Titles
 Israeli League Champion
 Israeli State Cup Champion

Honors
 European Champions Cup Runner-Up

Roster

Source: 1982 Roster, Maccabi Tel Aviv website

1982/83 
Titles
 Israeli League Champion
 Israeli State Cup Champion

Honors
 European Champions Cup Quarter-Finalist (5th)

Roster

Source: 1983 Roster, Maccabi Tel Aviv website

1983/84 
Titles
 Israeli League Champion

Honors
 European Champions Cup 5th Place

Roster

Source: 1984 Roster, Maccabi Tel Aviv website

1984/85 
Titles
 Israeli League Champion
 Israeli State Cup Champion

Honors
 European Champions Cup Semi Finalist (3rd)

Roster

Source: 1985 Roster, Maccabi Tel Aviv website

1985/86 
Titles
 Israeli League Champion
 Israeli State Cup Champion

Honors
 European Champions Cup Quarter-Finalist (5th)

Roster

Source: 1986 Roster, Maccabi Tel Aviv website

1986/87 
Titles
 Israeli League Champion
 Israeli State Cup Champion

Honors
 European Champions Cup Runner-Up

Roster

Source: 1987 Roster, Maccabi Tel Aviv website

1987/88 
Titles
 Israeli League Champion

Honors
 European Champions Cup Runner-Up

Roster

Source: 1988 Roster, Maccabi Tel Aviv website

1988/89 
Titles
 Israeli League Champion
 Israeli State Cup Champion

Honors
 European Champions Cup Runner-Up

Roster

Source: 1989 Roster, Maccabi Tel Aviv website

1989/90 
Titles
 Israeli League Champion
 Israeli State Cup Champion

Honors
 European Champions Cup Quarter-Finalist (6th)

Roster

Source: 1990 Roster, Maccabi Tel Aviv website

1990/91 
Titles
 Israeli League Champion
 Israeli State Cup Champion

Honors
 European Champions Cup Semi Finalist (3rd)

Roster

Source: 1991 Roster, Maccabi Tel Aviv website

1991/92 
Titles
 Israeli League Champion

Honors
 European Champions Cup Quarter Finalist

Roster

Source: 1992 Roster, Maccabi Tel Aviv website

1992/93 
Honors
 Israeli League Semi Finalist (3rd)
 European Champions Cup Regular season

Roster

Source: 1993 Roster, Maccabi Tel Aviv website

1993/94 
Titles
 Israeli League Champion
 Israeli State Cup Champion

Honors
 Korać Cup Quarter Finalist

Roster

Source: 1994 Roster, Maccabi Tel Aviv website

1994/95 
Titles
 Israeli League Champion

Honors
 Euroleague Round of 16

Roster

Source: 1995 Roster, Maccabi Tel Aviv website

1995/96 
Titles
 Israeli League Champion

Honors
 Israel State Cup Finalist
 Euroleague Quarter Finalist

Roster

Source: 1996 Roster, Maccabi Tel Aviv website

1996/97 
Titles
 Israeli League Champion

Honors
 Israel State Cup Finalist
 Euroleague Round of 16

Roster

Source: 1997 Roster, Maccabi Tel Aviv website

1997/98 
Titles
 Israeli League Champion
 Israeli State Cup Champion

Honors
 Euroleague Round of 16

Roster

Source: 1998 Roster, Maccabi Tel Aviv website

1998/99 
Titles
 Israeli League Champion
 Israeli State Cup Champion

Honors
 Euroleague Round of 16

Roster

Source: 1999 Roster, Maccabi Tel Aviv website

1999/2000 
Titles
 Israeli League Champion
 Israeli State Cup Champion

Honors
 Euroleague Runner-Up

Roster

Source: 2000 Roster, Maccabi Tel Aviv website

2000/01
Titles
 Suproleague Champion
 Israeli League Champion
 Israeli State Cup Champion

Roster

Source: 2001 Roster, Maccabi Tel Aviv website

2001/02 
Titles
 Israeli League Champion
 Israeli State Cup Champion

Honors
 Euroleague Semi Finalist (4th)

Roster

Source: 2002 Roster, Maccabi Tel Aviv website

2002/03
Titles
 Israeli League Champion
 Israeli State Cup Champion

Honors
 Euroleague Top-16
 Adriatic League Finalist

Roster

Source: 2003 Roster, Maccabi Tel Aviv website

2003/04
Titles
 Euroleague Champion
 Israeli League Champion
 Israeli State Cup Champion

Roster

Source: 2004 Roster, Maccabi Tel Aviv website

2004/05
Titles
 Euroleague Champion
 Israeli League Champion
 Israeli State Cup Champion

Roster

Source: 2005 Roster, Maccabi Tel Aviv website

2005/06
Titles
 Israeli League Israeli Champion
 Israeli State Cup Champion

Honors
 Euroleague Runner-Up

Roster

Source: 2006 Roster, Maccabi Tel Aviv website

2006/07
Titles
 Israeli League Champion

Honors
 Euroleague Quarter Finalist
 Israeli State Cup Semi-Finalist

Roster

Source: 2007 Roster, Maccabi Tel Aviv website

2007/08
Titles
 Israeli League Cup Champion

Honors
 Euroleague Runner-Up
 Israeli League  Finalist
 Israel State Cup Finalist

Roster

Source: 2008 Roster, Maccabi Tel Aviv website

2008/09
Titles
 Israeli League Champion

Honors
 Euroleague Top 16
 Israeli League Cup Quarterfinals
 Israel State Cup Second Round

Roster

Source: 2009 Roster, Maccabi Tel Aviv website

2009/10
Titles
 Israeli State Cup Champion

Honors
 Euroleague Quarter Finalist
 Israeli League Runner-Up
  Israeli League Cup Runner-Up

Roster

Source: 2010 Roster, Maccabi Tel Aviv website

2010/11
Titles
 Israeli State Cup Champion
 Israeli League Champion
 Israeli League Cup Champion

Honors
 Euroleague Runner-Up

Roster

Source: 2011 Roster, Maccabi Tel Aviv website

2011/12
Titles
  Israeli League Champion
  Israeli State Cup Champion
  Israeli League Cup Champion
  Adriatic League Champion

Honors
  Euroleague Quarter Finalist

Roster

Source: 2012 Roster, Maccabi Tel Aviv website

2012/13
Titles
  Israeli State Cup Champion
  Israeli League Cup Champion

Honors
  Euroleague Quarter Finalist
  Israeli League Runner-Up

Roster

Source: 2013 Roster, Maccabi Tel Aviv website

2013/14
Titles
  Euroleague Champion
  Israeli League Champion
  Israeli State Cup Champion
  Israeli League Cup Champion

Roster

Source: 2014 Roster, Maccabi Tel Aviv website

2014/15

Titles
  Israeli State Cup Champion

Honors
  FIBA Intercontinental Cup Runner-Up
  Euroleague Quarter Finalist
  Israeli League Semi-Finalist
  Israeli League Cup Runner-Up

Roster

Source: 2015 Roster, Maccabi Tel Aviv website

2015/16

Titles
  Israeli State Cup Champion
  Israeli League Cup Champion

Honors
  Israeli League Semi-Finalist
  Euroleague First Round
  Eurocup Last 32

Roster

Source: 2016 Roster, Maccabi Tel Aviv website

2016/17
Titles
  Israeli State Cup Champion

Honors
  Israeli League Semi-Finalist
  Israeli League Cup Runner-Up
  Euroleague Regular Season

Roster

Source: 2017 Roster, Maccabi Tel Aviv website

2017/18
Titles
  Israeli League Champion
  Israeli League Cup Champion

Honors
  Israeli State Cup Runner-Up
  Euroleague Regular Season

Roster

Source: 2018 Roster, Maccabi Tel Aviv website

2018/19
Titles
  Israeli League Champion
Honors
  Euroleague Regular Season
  Israeli State Cup Quarterfinals
  Israeli League Cup Quarterfinals

Roster

Source: 2019 Roster, Maccabi Tel Aviv website

2019/20
Titles
  Israeli League Champion
Honors
  Euroleague Regular Season 5 seed before season cancellation.
  Israel State Cup Quarterfinals
  Israeli League Cup Runner-Up

Roster

Source: 2020 Roster, Maccabi Tel Aviv website

2020/21
Titles
  Israeli League Champion
  Israeli State Cup Champion
  Israeli League Cup Champion
Honors
  Euroleague Regular Season
Roster

Source: 2021 Roster, Maccabi Tel Aviv website

2021/22
Titles
  Israeli League Cup Champion
Honors
  Israeli League Semi-Finalist
  Israeli State Cup Semi-Finalist
  Euroleague Quarter Finalist
Roster

Source: 2022 Roster, Maccabi Tel Aviv website

2022/23
Titles
  Israeli League Cup Champion
Honors
  Israeli State Cup Runner-Up
Roster

Source: 2023 Roster, Maccabi Tel Aviv website

EuroLeague team past rosters
Maccabi Tel Aviv B.C. players